Round Lake Area Schools, also known as Round Lake School District and sometimes identified as Community Unit School District 116, is a school district based in Round Lake, Illinois.

Schools
The district operates Round Lake High School and a number of middle and elementary schools.

• Round Lake Senior High School (Panthers)

• John T. Magee Middle School (Cougars)

• Round Lake Middle School (Wildcats)

• Beach Elementary School (Bobcats) 

• Ellis Elementary School (Eagles)

• Indian Hill Elementary School (Chiefs)

• Murphy Elementary School (Mustangs)

• Village Elementary School (Vikings)

• Kindergarten at Pleviak
 Early Education Center

References

External links

School districts in Lake County, Illinois